Old Mahabaleshwar, also known as Kshetra Mahabaleshwar, is a historical village in Mahabaleshwar, of the Satara district in the Indian state of Maharashtra. It is a hill station located near the Western Ghats, seven kilometers from Mahabaleshwar. It is home to three temples: the Panchganga temple, Mahabaleshwar temple, and Krishna temple.

Geography 

Old Mahabaleshwar includes Tandulni-Anand van Bhavan, Sambhaji Nagar, Gera Colony, and Dr. Keni Colony.

Religion

Panchganga Temple 

The Panchganga temple is located at the convergence of five rivers; Krishna, Venna, Savitri, Koyna, and Gayatri. Panchganga translates to English as "Five Rivers", and this temple is the attributed source of those rivers.

The temple was constructed in the 13th century by the Seuna king Simhana. Renovation of the Panchganga Temple took place during the 16th and 17th centuries under "Chanda Rao More" and Chhatrapati Shivaji. Panchganga temple in Old Mahabaleshwar is said to be 4,500 years old. There is no historical evidence for this claim.

Krishnbai Temple 
Krishnabai Temple, which is an old temple situated a few meters away from Panchganga temple in Old Mahabaleshwar. The temple is at a distance of 300 m from Mahabaleshwar temple and about 6 km from the Mahabaleshwar Bus Stand. It is one of the known tourist places in Mahabaleshwar. Krishnabai temple is supposed to be source of the Krishna River. The temple was built in 1888 by a ruler of Ratnagiri, on a hilltop that overlooks the Krishna valley. The temple has a Shiva lingam along with a stunning statue of the Goddess Krishna.

Demographics 

126 families reside in Old Mahabaleshwar. The village has a population of 785, including 408 males and 377 females as stated by the 2011 population census. The average sex ratio of the village is 1.082, which is higher than the Maharashtra state average of 0.929. The literacy rate of the village was 96.89% compared to 82.34% of Maharashtra. In old Mahabaleshwar, the male literacy was 98.00% while the female literacy rate was 92.62%.

References 

Mahabaleshwar
Hill stations in Maharashtra